The House of Torment (German: Das Haus der Qualen) is a 1921 German silent drama film directed by Carl Wilhelm and starring Ressel Orla, Fritz Kortner and Rudolf Klein-Rhoden.

The film's sets were designed by the art director Carl Ludwig Kirmse.

Cast 
 Ressel Orla as Maud 
 Fritz Kortner as Arzt 
 Rudolf Klein-Rhoden as Griffith
 Charles Willy Kayser
 Nien Soen Ling
 Nien Tso Ling
 Mabel May-Yong
 Harald Paulsen

References

Bibliography
 Grange, William. Cultural Chronicle of the Weimar Republic. Scarecrow Press, 2008.

External links

1921 films
Films of the Weimar Republic
German silent feature films
Films directed by Carl Wilhelm
1921 drama films
German drama films
Terra Film films
German black-and-white films
Silent drama films
1920s German films